The Winning Ticket is a 1935 American comedy film directed by Charles Reisner and starring Leo Carrillo, Louise Fazenda, and Ted Healy. It was released by Metro-Goldwyn-Mayer.

Plot summary
Poor Italian-American barber Joe Thomasello (Leo Carrillo) purchases a sweepstakes ticket at the urging of his brother-in-law Eddie Dugan (Ted Healy). Joe's wife Nora (Louise Fazenda) is against gambling. The ticket turns out to be a $150,000 first prize winner. Joe remembers that he gave the ticket to his lawyer Tony (Luis Alberni) to hold. The three men realize that Joe's baby, Mickey (Roland Fitzpatrick) was the last one seen with the ticket. When they ask the baby where the ticket is, the baby points to a loose board on the floor. The three men tear up the floor and dig a hole looking for the lost ticket to no avail. Tony, who has huge debts decides that the best thing to do is go to Ireland by boat and try to convince the sweepstakes officials that Joe was the actual sweepstakes winner.

Eddie has a fear of ships and is tricked by the other men into making the voyage. All the men are eventually kicked off the ship when Eddie is accused of being a stowaway. After this, the men witness baby Mickey stuffing paper into the mouth of one of his father's many ceramic parrots, which leads them to believe the baby had put the winning ticket into one of the birds. Mr. Powers (Purnell Pratt) has the men arrested after they destroy some of his ceramic birds. Nora, with baby Mickey visit Joe in jail and they present him with his guitar to help him pass the time. Nora and Joe end up in an argument and the guitar gets broken over Joe's head which exposes the winning ticket which was put into the guitar by Mickey earlier.

Cast
 Leo Carrillo as Joe Tomasello
 Louise Fazenda as Nora Tomasello
 Ted Healy as Eddie Dugan
 Irene Hervey as Mary Tomasello
 James Ellison as Jimmy
 Luis Alberni as Tony
 Purnell Pratt as Mr. Powers
 Akim Tamiroff as Giuseppe
 Betty Jane Graham as Noreen Tomasello
 Billy Watson as Joey Tomasello Jr.
 John Indrisano as Lefty Costello
 Roland Fitzpatrick as Mickey Tomasello
 Clara Blandick as Aunt Maggie
 Sam Flint as Captain (uncredited)
 Al Hill as Bookie (uncredited)
 Wilbur Mack as Banker (uncredited)
 Frank Moran as Bartender (uncredited)
 Lee Phelps as Bookmaker (uncredited)
 C. Montague Shaw as President of Insurance Company (uncredited)
 William Stack as Jeffries (uncredited)
 Larry Steers as Traveler (uncredited)
 Clarence Wilson as Dolan (uncredited)

Crew
 Cedric Gibbons - Art Director
 David Townsend - Associate Art Director
 Edwin B. Willis - Associate Art Director
 William Axt - Composer: stock music (uncredited)
 Douglas Shearer - Recording Director
 Charles Reisner - Co-Producer

References

External links
 
 
 

1935 films
1935 comedy films
1930s English-language films
American comedy films
American black-and-white films
Films directed by Charles Reisner
Films set in New York City
Metro-Goldwyn-Mayer films
1930s American films
Films with screenplays by Richard Schayer